Achim Schneider (born 31 July 1934) is a German water polo player. He competed at the 1956 Summer Olympics and the 1960 Summer Olympics.

References

1934 births
Living people
German male water polo players
Olympic water polo players of the United Team of Germany
Water polo players at the 1956 Summer Olympics
Water polo players at the 1960 Summer Olympics
Sportspeople from Duisburg